Spotted Lake(Kłlil’xᵂ) is a saline endorheic alkali lake located northwest of Osoyoos in the eastern Similkameen Valley of British Columbia, Canada, accessed via Highway 3.

Mineral and salt concentration 
Spotted Lake is richly concentrated with various minerals. It contains dense deposits of magnesium sulfate, calcium and sodium sulphates. It also contains high concentrations of eight other minerals and lower amounts of silver and titanium.

Most of the water in the lake evaporates over the summer, revealing colorful mineral deposits. Large 'spots' on the lake appear and are colored according to the mineral composition and seasonal amount of precipitation. Magnesium sulfate, which crystallizes in the summer, is a major contributor to spot color. In the summer, remaining minerals in the lake harden to form natural “walkways” around and between the spots.

Naming and history 
Originally known to the First Nations of the Okanagan Valley as Ktlil'k, Spotted Lake was for centuries and remains revered as a sacred site thought to provide therapeutic waters. During World War I, the minerals of Spotted Lake were used in manufacturing ammunition.

Later, the area came under the control of the Ernest Smith Family for a term of about 40 years. In 1979, Smith attempted to create interest in a spa at the lake. The First Nations responded with an effort to buy the lake, then in October 2001, struck a deal by purchasing 22 hectares of land for a total of $720,000, and contributed about 20% of the cost. The Indian Affairs Department paid the remainder.{{|date=July 2014}}

Spotted Lake today 

Today, there is a roadside sign telling visitors that the lake is a cultural and ecologically sensitive area, and a traditional medicine lake for the Okanagan Syilx people. The lake can be viewed from the fence that has been erected for protection from the liabilities of public access. Many travelers stop to view the site.

References

External links 

Spotted Lake: Something out of a Doctor Suess Book?
Flickr: People walking on the lake.

Tourist attractions in the Okanagan
First Nations history in British Columbia
Endorheic lakes of Canada
Saline lakes of Canada
Lakes of the Okanagan
Natural environment based therapies
Lakes of British Columbia
Similkameen Division Yale Land District